Vulture Street may refer to:
 Vulture Street, Brisbane, a street in Queensland, Australia
 Vulture Street (album), a music album by the group Powderfinger